"To My Bestfriend" (Korean 약속할게) is the second digital single released by South Korean boy band  Boyfriend. The single is a special gift to fans for the group's fifth anniversary. It was released May 26, 2016.

Track listing

Music videos

Release history

References 

Boyfriend (band) songs
Korean-language songs
2016 songs
Starship Entertainment singles
Song articles with missing songwriters